Pandanus laxespicatus is a screwpine or pandan of the wetlands of Madagascar, and belonging to the monocot family  Pandanaceae. It was of fairly recent discovery, having been unknown to science prior to 1951 when described by Martelli and Pichi-Sermolli. P. laxispicatus belongs to the same section (Acanthophylla) as P. pulcher. P. odorissimus and P obeliscus, which are known collectively as the Coniferoids, because their numerous side branches cause them to resemble huge Christmas trees. The  very large leaves are known as "crown megaphylls" and sometimes have the appearance  of a green "star" at the top of the tree. As the megaphylls fall away with age, they are replaced by side shoots of much smaller leaves (usually less than a foot (30 cm) long by an inch (2.5 cm) in width) which account for the conifer-like appearance of the mature trees.

References

laxespicatus